Texas's 29th congressional district of the United States House of Representatives covers the eastern portion of the Greater Houston area in the state of Texas.  The current Representative from the 29th district is Democrat Sylvia Garcia.

The Texas State Legislature established the district as a majority-Hispanic or Latino district. Democrat Gene Green, a non-Hispanic white, won the first election for the district in 1992 and held it for 18 terms.  In November 2017, Green announced that he would retire from Congress and would not run for re-election in 2018. Garcia won the election to succeed him.

Cities within the district

Cities wholly in the district
 Galena Park
 Jacinto City
 South Houston

Cities partially in the district
 Baytown (prior to 2013 redistricting)
 Houston
 Pasadena

Election results from presidential races

List of members representing the district

Election results

Historical district boundaries

See also

List of United States congressional districts

References

 Congressional Biographical Directory of the United States 1774–present

29
Harris County, Texas